Frank Barnitz (born March 17, 1968) is an American farmer, businessman, and politician who served as a Democratic member of the Missouri State Senate and Missouri House of Representatives.

Early life and education 
Barnitz was born and raised in Poplar Bluff, Missouri, and attended Southwest Missouri State University.

Career
Barnitz was first elected to the Missouri House of Representatives in 2000, and served in that body until 2005. He was elected to the Missouri State Senate in a special election in 2005, and served in that body until 2011. He was defeated in the November 2010 election by Republican Dan Brown.

Barnitz is the owner and operator of Networth Feeds and Feeding, a custom feed mill, and manages Barnitz Farms in Lake Spring, Missouri.

Personal life
Barnitz is married to Lisa Payne-Barnitz, and they have three daughters. Barnitz and his family are members of Grace Christian Church in Salem, Missouri.

References

Official Manual, State of Missouri, 2005-2006. Jefferson City, MO:Secretary of State

External links
Missouri Senate - Frank Barnitz official government website
 
Follow the Money - Frank Barnitz
2008 2006 Missouri Senate campaign contributions
2004 2002 2000 Missouri House campaign contributions

1968 births
Living people
People from Poplar Bluff, Missouri
People from Dent County, Missouri
Missouri State University alumni
Democratic Party Missouri state senators
Democratic Party members of the Missouri House of Representatives